Helicops is a genus of snakes of the family Colubridae. The genus is endemic to South America.

Species
The following 20 species are recognized as being valid.
Helicops acangussu 
Helicops angulatus  - brown-banded water snake
Helicops apiaka 
Helicops boitata 
Helicops carinicaudus  - Wied's keelback
Helicops danieli  - Daniel's keelback
Helicops gomesi  - São Paulo keelback
Helicops hagmanni   - Hagmann's keelback
Helicops infrataeniatus 
Helicops leopardinus  - leopard keelback
Helicops modestus  - olive keelback
Helicops nentur 
Helicops pastazae  - Shreve's keelback
Helicops petersi  - spiral keelback
Helicops phantasma 
Helicops polylepis  - Norman's keelback
Helicops scalaris  - ladder keelback 
Helicops tapajonicus 
Helicops trivittatus  - equatorial keelback
Helicops yacu  - Peru keelback

Nota bene: A binomial authority in parentheses indicates that the species was originally described in a genus other than Helicops.

References

Further reading
Freiberg M (1982). Snakes of South America. Hong Kong: T.F.H. Publications. 189 pp. . (Helicops, p. 99).
Wagler J (1828). Descriptiones et Icones Amphibiorum. Part I, Plates I-XIII. Munich, Stuttgart, Tübingen: J.G. Cotta. (Helicops, new genus, Plate VII). (in Latin).
https://serpientesdevenezuela.org/helicops-scalaris/

Helicops
Snake genera
Taxa named by Johann Georg Wagler